Achillea aspleniifolia is a species of flowering plant belonging to the family Asteraceae.

Its native range is Central and Southern Europe.

Synonym:
 Achillea asplenifolia (orthographical variant)

References

aspleniifolia